Sahan Palihakkara (born 14 October 1989) is a Sri Lankan cricketer. He is a right-handed batsman and leg-break bowler who plays for Saracens Sports Club. He was born in Kandy.

Palihakkara made his cricketing debut for the Under-23s team during the 2009 season, and made his List A debut during the 2009–10 season, against Bloomfield Cricket and Athletic Club. He is yet to score a run in List A cricket, but took figures of 3–37 on his debut with the ball.

References

External links
Sahan Palihakkara at Cricket Archive

1989 births
Living people
Sri Lankan cricketers
Saracens Sports Club cricketers
Cricketers from Kandy